Crocker is a surname shared by several notable real and fictional people, among them being:

 In Australia
 Sir Walter Crocker (1902–2002), Australian diplomat
 Barry Crocker (born 1935), Australian singer and actor
 Harold 'Mick' Crocker (1927–2014), Australian rugby league footballer
 Michael Crocker (born 1980), Australian rugby league player
 Patricia Crocker (1929–1992), Australian actress, especially on radio

 In the United Kingdom
 Henry Radcliffe Crocker (1846–1909), dermatologist
 Jonathan Crocker (1874–1944), cricketer
 Sir John Crocker (1896–1963), World War II British army officer
 Barbara Crocker (1910–1995), artist and author
Ellen Crocker (1872–1962) also known as 'Nellie' or 'Nelly', British suffragette
 Ian Crocker (commentator) (born 1965), British football radio commentator
 John Crocker (jazz musician) (born 1937), retired English jazz musician

 In the United States
 Uriel Crocker (1796–1887), American railroad and publishing entrepreneur
 Alvah Crocker (1801–1874), American politician
 Zebulon Crocker (1802-1847), American pastor
 Samuel L. Crocker (1804–1883), American politician
 Hans Crocker (1815–1889), American lawyer and politician
 Charles Crocker (1822–1888), American railroad tycoon
 Marcellus M. Crocker (1830–1865), Civil War general
 Susan Elizabeth Wood Crocker (1836–1922), American physician
 William H. Crocker (1861–1937), American entrepreneur
 Albert Crocker (1882–1961), American inventor and entrepreneur
 Harry Crocker (1893–1958), American film actor
 Fay Crocker (1914–1983), professional golfer
 Frankie Crocker (1937–2000), American radio personality
 Susan Crocker (born 1940), American photographer
 Chester Crocker (born 1941), American diplomat
 Steve Crocker (born 1944), American computer systems researcher
 Ryan Crocker (born 1949), American diplomat
 Lee Daniel Crocker (born 1963), American free software developer
 Erin Crocker (born 1981), American race car driver
 Ian Crocker (born 1982), American Olympic swimming medalist
 Chris Crocker (Internet celebrity) (born 1987), American internet celebrity
Sean Crocker (born 1996), American golfer
In Canada:

 Eva Crocker, Canadian writer
 Steve Crocker, Canadian politician
 Suzanne Crocker, Canadian documentary filmmaker
 Willard Crocker (1898 or 1900–1964), Canadian tennis player
 Laura Walker (born Laura Crocker, 1990), Canadian curler

Fictional characters
Senior Chief Manilow Crocker, from seaQuest DSV
Denzel Q. Crocker, from The Fairly OddParents
Jane Crocker, from the webcomic Homestuck
Roy Crocker, fictional character in Haven
Simon Crocker, fictional character in Haven
Duke Crocker, fictional character in Haven
Betty Crocker, fictional character in cooking advertisements
 Billy Crocker,  a young Wall Street broker in love with Hope from Anything Goes

Notes

Occupational surnames
English-language occupational surnames